Football Féminin Yzeure Allier Auvergne, formerly named FCF Nord Allier Yzeure, is a French women's football club founded in 1999 based in Yzeure. It was promoted to D1 Féminine for the first time in its history following the conclusion of the 2007-2008 season. Its best result in the championship so far is a fifth place. It has also reached the national cup's quarterfinals twice.

Current squad
As of 23 March 2022.

Honours
 D2 Féminine Champion: 2008

Season to season

References

External links
 Official website 

Yzeure Allier Auvergne
Association football clubs established in 1999
1999 establishments in France
Division 1 Féminine clubs
Sport in Allier
Footballers from Auvergne-Rhône-Alpes